Harimohan Ghose College, established in 1963, is an undergraduate college in Garden Reach, Kolkata. It is affiliated to the University of Calcutta.

Departments

Science
Chemistry
Physics
Mathematics
Physiology
Botany

Arts and Commerce
Bengali
English
Urdu
History
Political Science
Economics
Education
Commerce

Accreditation
Harimohan Ghose College is recognized by the University Grants Commission (UGC).

Death of Police officer in student politics
The college shot to limelight on 11 February 2013, when Assistant Sub Inspector 
Tapas Chowdhury was shot dead during preparations for student
elections.  Live TV footage taken by ABP Ananda showed
the gun being fired by Sheikh Suhan, who was able to flee despite a
significant police presence at the
spot.

President of the college governing
body, Trinamool Congress minister Firhad Hakim, initially suggested that Congress goons were behind the firing.
This was retracted after the TV footage was aired and it was
determined that
the pistol-wielding Sheikh Suhan was the nephew of an assistant to
Trinamool councillor Muhammad Iqbal (Munna), who went into hiding after the
incident. Munna was arrested from Dehri-on-Sone later

Teachers of the college were unaware of the dates for the election.  They felt "sidelined since no one bothers to listen to our suggestions" and said that the "governing body has not done anything to improve the academic standards".

See also
 Garden reach
List of colleges affiliated to the University of Calcutta
Education in India
Education in West Bengal

References

External links
 Harimohan Ghose College 

Educational institutions established in 1963
University of Calcutta affiliates
Universities and colleges in Kolkata
1963 establishments in West Bengal